Perception is a peer-reviewed scientific journal specialising in the psychology of vision and perception. Founded by Richard Gregory, it is available in print form and online. It publishes primary research from any discipline within the sensory sciences. The journal is indexed in PubMed.

External links 
 

Perception journals
Vision
Neuroscience journals
English-language journals
Publications established in 1972
SAGE Publishing academic journals